Barleria elegans (Common names: Eng.: white bushveld barleria; Afr.: wit bosviooltjie) is a species of plants in the family Acanthaceae. It is found in South Africa.

References

External links
 Barleria elegans at The Plant List
 Barleria elegans at Tropicos
 Barleria elegans at SANBI (South African National Biodiversity Institute)

elegans
Plants described in 1880
Flora of South Africa